Le Vingtième de cavalerie is a Lucky Luke adventure written by Goscinny and illustrated by Morris. It is the twenty-seventh book in the series and it was originally published in French in 1965 and English in 2010 as The Twentieth Cavalry.

Plot
Buffaloes having been illegally hunted on their territory, which the Cheyenne need for their survival, the Cheyenne break the treaty authorizing the free movement of whites on it. Worse than that is that someone has even provided the Indians with firearms! Lucky Luke is sent to find a solution to the crisis and do everything to get a new pact signed between Yellow Dog and McStraggle, colonel of the 20th Cavalry Regiment.

Lucky Luke volunteers as scout for the 20th Cavalry and, visiting Yellow Dog, quickly finds out that Derek Flood, a renegade cavalrist, is hatching a plot against McStraggle for having kicked him out of the army. The situation for the beleaguered soldiers becomes more desperate as Flood exploits his insider knowledge of the fort to starve out his ex-comrades. Lucky Luke and Grover escape the siege to fetch reinforcements to rescue their comrades. The reinforcements arrive just as McStraggle leads a potentially suicidal charge out the fort, forcing the Indians to surrender. Flood is arrested.

Characters 

 Colonel McStraggle: Commanding the regiment 20th cavalry.
 Ming Li Foo: Launderer.
 Derek Flood: Deserter and arms dealer.
 Grover McStraggle: Rider of the regiment, son of the colonel.
 Jeremiah Bowler: Hatter.
 Yellow Dog: Chief of the Cheyenne.
 Crazy Coyote: Chief of the Sioux.
 Sick Eagle: Chief of the Arapahoes.

Notes
 The character of Colonel McStraggle is a nod on actor Randolph Scott.

External links
 Lucky Luke official site album index 
 Goscinny website on Lucky Luke

Comics by Morris (cartoonist)
Lucky Luke albums
1965 graphic novels
Works by René Goscinny
Works about Native Americans
Military of the United States in fiction